Maling Kutang (literally The Bra Thief) is a 2009 Indonesian comedy film directed by Rako Prijanto. Starring Arie K. Untung, Indra Birowo, Deswita Maharani, and Kinaryosih, it follows two neighbours who steal a bra they think is magical. It was released to mixed critical reception.

Plot
Syamsul (Indra Birowo) and his wife Yuyun (Deswita Maharani) run an unsuccessful grocery store and are looking for a way to compete with that run by the friendly Ina (Kinaryosih), which is always full. Meanwhile, Sugeni (Arie K. Utung) is a chocolate salesman who wears a gorilla costume while working. As he is unsuccessful, his grandmother (Nani Widjaja) tells him to work as a transvestite. When this fails, the upset Sugeni throws away his grandmother's polka dot bra which he is wearing. It lands in front of Ina's shop. Ina, awakened by the noise, goes outside moments after Sugeni flees.

Yuyun, a strong believer in the supernatural, sees Ina pick up the bra and assumes that she is praying to it; she credits these prayers for Ina's successful business. She tells Syamsul to steal the bra, and the following night they sneak into Ina's home and take all of the bras there. Sugeni, meanwhile, is scolded by his grandmother for losing her bra and must find it.

The theft becomes a national sensation after it is reported, leading Syamsul to have nightmares. He attempts to throw the bra off the balcony, but is stopped by Yuyun. As they are fighting, Sugeni passes by and sees the bra before they finish their argument. That night he sneaks into Yuyun and Syamsul's home, dressed as a demon, to take the bra, but must leave after he is spotted. The following day Syamsul and Yuyun call a dukun (shaman) to exorcise their home; the dukun is actually Sugeni in disguise, and he tells Syamsul to discard the bra. When Syamsul does this, the bra is caught on a passing odong-odong (carriage). Yuyun cries out that the driver has stolen her bra, and the villagers chase the odong-odong and begin beating the driver. Yuyun, meanwhile, steals the bra.

Afraid that they will be caught, Syamsul and Yuyun begin trying various schemes to get rid of the bra. When they try to leave it in the woods, Sugeni (in his gorilla costume) follows them and tries to take it. However, two park rangers see him and – thinking he is a real gorilla – shoot him with tranquillisers. He stumbles through the woods and takes refuge in a truck, which is on the way to Syamsul and Yuyun's shop to deliver supplies. Bakrie (Ence Bagus), the driver, delivers the boxes and, unknowingly, the bra, to the store. When Syamsul and Yuyun discover the bra, they are shocked.

They then try to throw the bra in the sea, and bury it, but nothing works. Finally they burn it. Meanwhile, Sugeni – who has realised that he lost the bra again – meets a transvestite named Alfred, who directs him to a store in Blok M, where he discovers that the bra is in fact a rare model designed by Slamet Kartowardoyo. Sugeni buys a new one from the designer, but when he returns home he discovers that his grandmother has died. Sugeni then throws away the bra, and it ends up at Syamsul and Yuyun's home. The couple are now bankrupt, and Bakrie finds the bra. When Ina sees him picking it up she calls the police, who are able to unravel the whole story. Syamsul, Yuyun, and Bakrie move elsewhere, where they become rich selling bras.

A year later, their old store has been occupied by a husband and wife (Andi Soraya and Epy Kusnandar). The couple has opened another grocery store. One night, as Alfred is passing, he wets himself in front of Ina's home and discards his panties there. When Ina tries to pick them up, the cycle starts again: the new neighbours think she is praying, and begin planning to steal the garment.

Production
Maling Kutang was directed by Rako Prijanto, best known for his comedies, and produced by Ody Mulya Hidayat of Maxima Pictures. The script was written by Raditya Dika, who had recently become popular after the success of his blog-turned-novel Kambing Jantan. A review of the film in The Jakarta Globe suggested that Dika had an "incongruous style of observational humour", which remained evident in Maling Kutang. Cinematography, which took less than a week, was handled by Rendra Yusworo, while editing was completed by Azis Natandra. Music was provided by Joseph S Djafar, with Yusuf A Patawari and Khikmawan Santosa on sound.

The film starred Arie K. Untung, Indra Birowo, Deswita Maharani, and Kinaryosih, with minor roles played by actors including Fanny Fadillah and Nani Widjaja. In an interview, Kinaryosih – who had several years' experience working in comedies – stated that she had been told the title was Kutang Kutangkap (I Catch a Bra) during casting.

The film's title is a play on Malin Kundang, a Minang folktale.

Release and reception
Maling Kutang was released on 1 October 2009, with a press screening at Jakarta Theater the day before. This was several weeks before Dika's Menculik Miyabi (Kidnapping Miyabi), starring AV idol Maria Ozawa, was scheduled to begin production.

The film received a mixed reception. A review in The Jakarta Globe suggested that Maling Kutang was a "like a mere preview" for Menculik Miyabi. The reviewer praised several aspects of the film, including Untung's "Jim Carrey-esque" performance, and summarised that Maling Kutang was sufficient for "a few light laughs", but audiences might find it better to wait for Menculik Miyabi. A review on the entertainment website KapanLagi.com found the film better than its title suggested, with a clear plot and good performances by Birowo and Maharani, but considered the reliance on sexual innuendo to be poor form. Kartoyo DS, writing for Suara Karya, considered the comedy forced; he wrote that the film, unlike the Warkop comedies of the 1980s, did not produce any laughs.

Footnotes

Works cited

External links

2009 comedy films
2009 films
Films shot in Indonesia
Indonesian comedy films
Films directed by Rako Prijanto